Elsornis is a genus of enantiornithine bird. Only one species is known, Elsornis keni. It lived during the Late Cretaceous. It is known from a partially articulated fossil skeleton found in the Gobi Desert in Mongolia.

The holotype fossil is given catalog number MPD - b 100/201. It is in the collection of the Mongolian  Palaeontological Center. The fossil was collected at Togrogiin Shiree, South Gobi Aimak, Mongolia; Djadokhta Formation, Late Cretaceous, Campanian.

The fossil is extremely well preserved in three dimensions. It preserves a pneumatized Furcula, which was a character previously unknown in enantiornithines. Chiappe et al. (2007) conclude from the proportions of Elsornis ' pectoral skeleton that it was flightless or nearly so.

A study by Atterholt et al. in 2018 places Elsornis in the family Avisauridae.

Etymology
The Genus name Elsornis is derived from the Mongolian word "Els", meaning "sand", and "ornis", the Greek word for "bird". The species name "keni" honors Mr. Ken Hayashibara.

References

Bird genera
Late Cretaceous birds of Asia
Enantiornitheans
Fossil taxa described in 2007
Fossils of Mongolia

Extinct flightless birds